Calgary-Hawkwood was a provincial electoral district in Calgary, Alberta, Canada, mandated to return a single member to the Legislative Assembly of Alberta using the first past the post method of voting from 2012 to 2019.

History
The Calgary-Hawkwood electoral district was created in the 2010 Alberta boundary re-distribution. It was created from parts of Calgary-Bow, Calgary-Foothills, Calgary-North West and a small portion of Calgary-Varsity.

The Calgary-Hawkwood electoral district was dissolved in the 2017 electoral boundary re-distribution into Calgary-Edgemont ahead of the 2019 Alberta general election.

Boundary history

Electoral history

The antecedent electoral districts that comprise Calgary-Hawkwood have been returning mainly Progressive Conservative and the occasional Liberal candidates to office since the 1970s. Varsity has returned a Liberal candidate since 2004 and North West returned a Liberal candidate from 1989 to 1997.

Legislature results

2012 general election

2015 general election

Senate nominee results

2012 Senate nominee election district results

Student vote results

2012 election

See also
List of Alberta provincial electoral districts

References

External links
Elections Alberta
The Legislative Assembly of Alberta

Former provincial electoral districts of Alberta
Politics of Calgary